Karima Adebibe (also known as Karima McAdams; born 14 February 1985) is an English actress and fashion model.

Life and career 
Adebibe was born in Bethnal Green, in Tower Hamlets, London, England but grew up in Tangier before moving back to the UK. Adebibe is of Irish, Greek Cypriot and Moroccan origins.

Formerly a secretary, she was selected on 14 February 2006 (both her birthday and that of Lara Croft) to be the seventh model for Lara Croft in the popular video game series Tomb Raider. The role involved promoting the game series "in-character" on television and radio, so Adebibe underwent training in Lara Croft's trademark skills, from martial arts to elocution. She retired from the role of Lara Croft in 2008.

Adebibe was featured in "The HOT List" in a March 2006 issue of Zoo.

She had previously had a small role as a sacrificial maiden in the 2004 film Alien vs. Predator. She appeared in the film Frontier Blues in 2009.

In January 2021, she announced her pregnancy with her partner, rapper Professor Green.

Filmography

Film

Television

References

External links 

 
 
 Karima Adebibe visiting Poland - coverage by TVPW television

1985 births
English people of Moroccan descent
English people of Irish descent
English people of Greek Cypriot descent
English female models
English film actresses
English television actresses
Living people
People from Bethnal Green
21st-century English actresses
British expatriates in Morocco

de:Lara Croft#Lara-Croft-Doubles